The 1997 Frankfurt Galaxy season was the fifth season for the franchise in the World League of American Football (WLAF). The team was led by head coach Ernie Stautner in his third year, and played its home games at Waldstadion in Frankfurt, Germany. They finished the regular season in fifth place with a record of four wins and six losses.

Offseason

World League draft

Personnel

Staff

Roster

Schedule

Standings

Game summaries

Week 1: at London Monarchs

Week 2: vs Amsterdam Admirals

Week 3: at Barcelona Dragons

Week 4: vs Scottish Claymores

Week 5: at Rhein Fire

Week 6: vs Rhein Fire

Week 7: vs London Monarchs

Week 8: at Scottish Claymores

Week 9: vs Barcelona Dragons

Week 10: at Amsterdam Admirals

Awards
After the completion of the regular season, the All-World League team was selected by members of the media. Overall, Frankfurt had eight players selected. The selections were:

 Shawn Banks, linebacker
 Hillary Butler, linebacker
 Johnny Dixon, safety
 Cecil Doggette, cornerback
 Jack Kellogg, cornerback
 Ralf Kleinmann, placekicker
 Frank Messmer, defensive national player
 Bobby Phillips, running back

Notes

References

Frankfurt Galaxy seasons